Persas stands for Persatuan Sepakbola Sabang (en: Football Association of Sabang). Persas Sabang is an  Indonesian football club based in Sabang, Weh Island, Aceh. Club played in Liga 3.

References

External links
Liga-Indonesia.co.id

Football clubs in Indonesia
Football clubs in Aceh